Cyril Abidi (born February 25, 1976), nicknamed "The Marseille Bad Boy", is a French former heavyweight kickboxer and mixed martial artist. A professional competitor from 1998 until 2007, he is perhaps best remembered for his upset first-round knockout win over Peter Aerts, which he followed up with another win in the rematch a month later. Abidi also defeated K-1 standouts Ray Sefo and Petar Majstorovic.

Background
Abidi grew up in the north quartiers of Marseille (Consolat), in a modest Tunisian family. When he was 6, his mother took him to judo classes to keep him off the streets. He practiced judo for four years until he was inspired by Bruce Lee, his childhood idol, and started taking karate lessons. 
 
When he was 18, he discovered Thaiboxing and became French champion at the age of 20.

Career
A year later he entered K-1, fighting against Petar Majstorovic in Zurich, Switzerland, and winning by a unanimous decision. Later that year, he faced legendary Dutch fighter Peter Aerts on July 7. A heavy underdog, Abidi surprised many by knocking out Aerts with a right cross at 2:13 of the first round. A month later the two squared off again at the 2000 Heavyweight Grand Prix in Yokohama, with Abidi winning again in the first round after Aerts' corner threw in the towel. After causing another mild upset with a win over Ray Sefo later that night, Abidi faced Francisco Filho for the heavyweight final. Abidi lost after his corner threw in the towel in the second round. Later on December 10 of that same year, Abidi and Aerts faced off for a third time at the 2000 Japan World Grand Prix, with Aerts this time winning via unanimous decision. Later that night, Abidi fought in a rematch with Ray Sefo, their last bout being the semifinal of the Yokohama Grand Prix. Sefo avenged his defeat via first-round TKO.

After starting off 2001 with a decision win, Abidi was upset by South African Andrew Thomson, losing via TKO just 1:15 into the first round. He fought just once more in 2001, winning via fourth-round TKO. After a KO win May 2002, it was announced Abidi would face then PRIDE Middleweight contender and future UFC Light Heavyweight Champion, Quinton Jackson. Many pundits did not expect Jackson's wild brawling style to be adaptable to K-1 competition against a well-rounded striker such as Abidi. However, Abidi lost via upset after being knocked out just under two minutes into the first round. After losing to Bob Sapp in another quick first-round defeat, Abidi faced Jackson in a rematch at the Inoki Bom-Ba-Ye event in 2002. Abidi lost again, this time via decision after three rounds.

In his short foray into mixed martial arts, Abidi lost to Nigerian comedian Bobby Ologun in his first fight in MMA. Abidi was a last minute replacement for Mike Bernardo who was injured. The events surrounding the outcome raised suspicion of a fixed fight and Abidi seemed to lend credence to this in a post match interview.

His fight against fellow Frenchman and rival Jérôme Le Banner at K-1 World Grand Prix 2005 in Paris, on May 27, 2005, is considered to be one of the greatest battles in K-1 history. Abidi lost by a technical knockout. After losing the fight, Abidi stirred controversy by throwing three strikes at Le Banner, who deflected them but both fighters would have to be restrained by their corners and the officials ringside.

Titles
 2003 K-1 World GP 3rd place
 2003 K-1 World Grand Prix in Paris runner up
 2000 K-1 World GP 2rd place
 2000 K-1 World GP in Yokohama runner up
 2000 Thai Boxing World champion
 2000 French Heavyweight Amateur Boxing champion
 1996 French Kickboxing champion

Kickboxing record

Mixed martial arts record

|-
| Loss
|align=center| 0–2
| Bobby Ologun
| Decision (unanimous)
| K-1 Premium Dynamite!!, Japan
| 
|align=center| 3
|align=center| 3:00
|Osaka, Japan
|
|-
| Loss
|align=center| 0–1
| Don Frye
| Submission (rear-naked choke)
| Inoki Bom-Ba-Ye 2001, Japan
| 
|align=center| 2
|align=center| 0:33
|Saitama, Japan
|

See also
List of male kickboxers
List of K-1 events
List of K-1 champions

References

External links

Cyril Abidi's website
Profile at K-1

1976 births
Living people
French male kickboxers
Tunisian male kickboxers
Heavyweight kickboxers
French male mixed martial artists
Heavyweight mixed martial artists
Mixed martial artists utilizing Muay Thai
Mixed martial artists utilizing judo
Mixed martial artists utilizing karate
French Muay Thai practitioners
French male judoka
French male karateka
Sportspeople from Marseille
French sportspeople of Tunisian descent